David Ellison (1939 – 10 June 2010) was a British television actor born in Stalybridge, probably best remembered for his portrayal of police sergeant Joseph Beck, in the 1980s BBC television series Juliet Bravo. He also had minor roles in TV shows such as Coronation Street, The Sweeney, Ripping Yarns, Heartbeat, Last Of The Summer Wine, The Bill and Waiting For God.

He gave up acting in 1995 and retired to the village of Beer in Devon. He died on 10 June 2010.

References

English male television actors
People from Stalybridge
Male actors from Greater Manchester
1939 births
2010 deaths